Javadiyeh is a neighborhood of Tehran.

Javadiyeh or Javadieh may refer to:
 Javadiyeh, Arsanjan, Fars Province
 Javadiyeh, Eqlid, Fars Province
 Javadieh, Shiraz, Fars Province
 Javadiyeh, Hamadan
 Javadiyeh ol Hiyeh, Kerman Province
 Javadiyeh-ye Mortazavi, Kerman Province
 Javadiyeh-ye Zeydabad, Kerman province
 Javadiyeh, Markazi
 Javadiyeh, Mashhad, Razavi Khorasan Province
 Javadiyeh, Nishapur, Razavi Khorasan Province
 Javadiyeh, Torbat-e Heydarieh, Razavi Khorasan Province
 Javadiyeh, South Khorasan